Satoko Kishimoto (born 15 July 1974) is a Japanese politician and book editor. She is the first female mayor of Suginami, Tokyo.

Kishimoto spent some of her adult life in Europe before returning to Japan and entering politics unaffiliated with any political party. She is the editor of an anti-water privatisation book.

Early life 
Kishimoto was born on 15 July 1974. She grew up in Japan, before moving to the Netherlands aged 25, then moving to Leuven, Belgium in 2008.

Career
Kishimoto became interested in Japanese politics while working at the Transnational Institute, a non-profit organisation in Amsterdam, and attracted a grass-roots following with online debates during the COVID-19 pandemic. She was unsure of moving back to Japan permanently as she felt it would disrupt her children's schooling, but agreed to do so in April 2022 in order to campaign for mayor.

In May 2022, while campaigning, Kishimoto took part in an anti-gentrification march in Koenji.

Kishimoto was elected in June 2022 as an independent candidate, defeating the incumbent conservative mayor by 187 votes. She became Suginami's first female elected mayor.

Views
Kishimoto has voiced concern about the lack of gender diversity in Japanese politics, believing it to be a serious detriment to the country. Of the 23 elected mayors in Tokyo, only three are women. She has faced criticism from some male subordinates over her gender, her lack of established political experience, and for living outside Japan for several years. She has spoken out against verbal and physical harassment by men. Along with other female Japanese politicians, she started the website Harassment Consultation Centre for Women in Politics.

Kishimoto has opposed roadbuilding projects in Koenji. She is against privatisation and has edited a book outlining alternatives to water privatisation.

Personal life 
Kishimoto is married and has two children.

References

21st-century Japanese women politicians
Women founders
Living people
People from Suginami
Japanese women editors
Japanese emigrants to the Netherlands
Japanese emigrants to Belgium
Japanese women activists
1974 births